The Kutubuan languages are a small family of neighboring languages families in Papua New Guinea. 
They are named after Lake Kutubu in Papua New Guinea.

Languages
There has been some debate over whether they are closer to each other than to other languages, but Usher includes them both in the Kikorian branch of the tentative Papuan Gulf stock.
Within the two branches, the lexicostatistical figures are 60–70%. Between the two branches, they are 10–20%.

East Kutubuan
Foe, Fiwaga
West Kutubuan
Fasu, Some, Namumi

Proto-language
Some lexical reconstructions by Usher (2020) are:

{| class="wikitable sortable"
! gloss !! Proto-Lake Kutubu
|-
| head || *uni
|-
| hair/feather(s) || *iti
|-
| eye/sixteen || *hʲĩ
|-
| nose || *sabe
|-
| tooth || *mete
|-
| tongue || *atu
|-
| foot/leg || *kotage
|-
| bone || *kigi
|-
| skin/bark || *ga[o/u]
|-
| breast || *hʲokõ
|-
| dog || *g[e/ẽ/a]s[a/ã]
|-
| pig/game || *mena
|-
| bird || *hʲaka
|-
| egg || *kapa
|-
| tree || *ita
|-
| moon || *he̝ge̝
|-
| water || *hẽ
|-
| fire || *ita
|-
| stone || *kana
|-
| path || *ig[i]a
|-
| eat/drink || *ne-
|-
| one || *hʲaga
|}

Vocabulary comparison
The following basic vocabulary words are from Franklin (1975), Franklin & Voorhoeve (1973), McElhanon and Voorhoeve (1970), and Shaw (1986), as cited in the Trans-New Guinea database:

{| class="wikitable sortable"
! gloss !! Foi !! Fasu (Namumi dialect) !! Fasu
|-
! head
| a̧řuhai || unahaie || wamo
|-
! hair
| u̧sæ̧ || unahai iti || iti; uni iti
|-
! ear
| yo ḳʰiyʌ || sinaeki; sinæki || senaki
|-
! eye
| i̧y || hi̧; hĩ || hi; hi̧; hĩ
|-
! nose
| s̭abɛi || sapasuma || sape
|-
! tooth
| ṱi || akai || mere
|-
! tongue
| auřu || airu || alu; aru
|-
! leg
| ṱamʌ || kofai; kɔfai || korake
|-
! louse
| ṱʌbʌľi ||  || yapani
|-
! dog
| ḳɛsʌ || kasa || kasa
|-
! pig
|  || girɔ || saro
|-
! bird
| yaʔ || minai || mena
|-
! egg
| hʌ̧ⁱ || hai || mena hai
|-
! blood
| weḷia || kakusa || yapi
|-
! bone
| kʰikʰi || kiki || kiki
|-
! skin
| ḳaḳo || kau || kau
|-
! breast
| o̧ḳo̧ || hotu; hɔtu || hoko
|-
! tree
| iʔʌ || ira || ira
|-
! man
| amɛnʌ || abano; abanɔ || aporo
|-
! woman
| ḳa̧· || hinamu || hinamo
|-
! sun
| iřiyapo || iya; maiya; maya || maiya; maĩya
|-
! moon
| hɛḳɛ || hɩki || heke
|-
! water
| ipu || hi̧; hĩ || hẽ; hȩ; hę
|-
! fire
| iřʌ || irə kipu; irʌkupi || dufi; ira lufi
|-
! stone
| kʰa̧nʌ || ɩki || eke
|-
! name
| yaᵽo || iyanu || yano
|-
! eat
| niyæi || nesi || anene; na
|-
! one
| mɛna̧ḳɛ || hakasa; nakasa || meno
|-
! two
| ha̧ḳɛ || tita || teta
|}

Evolution
Proposed Kutubu reflexes of proto-Trans-New Guinea (pTNG) etyma are:

Foi language:
 ‘carry on back’ < *
 ‘die’ < *
 ‘eat’ < *
 ‘leg’ < *
 ‘neck’ < *
 ‘tree’ < *
 ‘wind’ < *
 ‘bird’ < *
 ‘mother’s sister’ < * ‘older same sex sibling’

Fasu language:
 ‘die’ < *
 ‘eat’ < *
 ‘stand’ < 
 ‘mother’ < *
 ‘father’ < *
 ‘heart, stomach’ < *
 ‘hair’ < *
 ‘leg’ < *
 ‘shoulder’ < *
 ‘skin’ < *
 ‘hand’ < *
 ‘urine’ < *
 ‘make the law’ < * ‘instructions’
 ‘long’ < *
 ‘husband’ < *
 ‘mother’s sister’ < * ‘older same sex sibling’
 ‘tree’ < *
 ‘sand’ < *
 ‘wind’ < *

References

External links 
 Timothy Usher, New Guinea World, Proto–Lake Kutubu

 
Languages of Southern Highlands Province
Kikorian languages